David O'Brien Martin (April 26, 1944 – November 20, 2012) was an American lawyer, politician, and veteran of the Vietnam War who served six terms as a Republican member of the United States House of Representatives from New York from 1981 to 1993.

Early life and education 
Martin was born in St. Lawrence County, New York. He graduated from Hugh C. Williams High School (Canton, New York) in 1962, and the University of Notre Dame in 1966. He graduated from Albany Law School in 1973.

Vietnam War 
From 1966–70, he served in the United States Marine Corps as a flight officer, and deployed to Vietnam during the Vietnam War. He achieved the rank of captain.

Political career 
He was a member of the New York State Assembly from 1977 to 1980, sitting in the 182nd and 183rd New York State Legislature.

Congress 
He was elected to the U.S. House of Representatives in 1980 and served from January 3, 1981 to January 3, 1993.  He was succeeded by John M. McHugh. Due to redistricting which took effect after the 1992 elections, the geographical area Martin represented was renumbered, and McHugh took office as the representative from the 24th district of New York. Martin did not run in the 1992 election. 

While in Congress, he was a member of the House Armed Services Committee, where he worked to shape national security policy in the final years of the Cold War. Martin was the primary sponsor of one successfully enacted bill in 1990 allowing the Secretary of the Air Force to purchase housing for Air Force members at the Pease Air Force Base. Overall, he introduced 6 bills.

Later career 
After Congress, he taught at the Naval War College from 1993 to 1994, and subsequently founded the government relations firm of Martin, Fisher, and Thompson in Washington.

Private life 
He married twice, first to DeeAnn Hedlund with whom he had three daughters, then to Dana McGee.

Death 
He resided in Hedgesville, West Virginia, where he died November 20, 2012 from cancer, aged 68.  He is interred in Arlington National Cemetery.

References

External links

1944 births
2012 deaths
20th-century American politicians
United States Marine Corps personnel of the Vietnam War
Republican Party members of the New York State Assembly
People from St. Lawrence County, New York
University of Notre Dame alumni
Albany Law School alumni
United States Marine Corps officers
Deaths from cancer in West Virginia
Republican Party members of the United States House of Representatives from New York (state)
People from Hedgesville, West Virginia
Naval War College faculty
Burials at Arlington National Cemetery
Members of Congress who became lobbyists